The electoral history of Howie Hawkins includes the 2020 Green Party presidential primaries and caucuses, campaigns for United States Senate and House of Representatives in New York, and the city of Syracuse, New York.

Electoral history

City of Syracuse elections

2009

2011

2013

2015

2017

New York gubernational elections

2010

2014

2018

United States House of Representatives elections

2000

2004

2008

United States Senate elections

2006

United States Presidential elections

2016
Howie Hawkins stood in for Ajamu Baraka as Jill Stein's vice-presidential running mate in Minnesota in 2016.

2020

References

Hawkins, Howie
Hawkins, Howie
Howie Hawkins